Charles Isaac Williams (born July 18, 1932) is an alto saxophonist based in New York City.

Biography
Williams was born in Halls, Tennessee and moved to Alton, Illinois at the age of eight where he later played in the junior high school band, majored in music education at Lincoln University, in Jefferson City, Missouri and taught orchestral music in St. Albans, Queens. He released three albums on the Mainstream label in the early 1970s. Williams also played with Clark Terry, Frank Foster, and singer Ruth Brown. In 1995 Hamiett Bluiett approached record producer Pierre Sprey's Mapleshade label and convinced them to record Williams first album in more than two decades.

Discography
 Charles Williams (Mainstream, 1971)
 Trees and Grass and Things (Mainstream, 1971)
 Stickball (Mainstream, 1972)
 Snake Johnson with Ted Curson (Chiaroscuro, 1981)
 When Alto Was King (Mapleshade, 1997)

References

1932 births
American jazz musicians
Living people
People from Halls, Tennessee
Jazz musicians from Tennessee
Mapleshade Records artists